Pseudicius adustus is a jumping spider species in the genus Pseudicius that lives in Namibia. The female was first described in 2006.

References

Endemic fauna of Namibia
Salticidae
Fauna of Namibia
Spiders described in 2006
Spiders of Africa
Taxa named by Wanda Wesołowska